The 2019 Nur-Sultan Challenger was a professional tennis tournament played on indoor hard courts. It was the first edition of the tournament which was part of the 2019 ATP Challenger Tour. It took place in Nur-Sultan, Kazakhstan between 30 September and 6 October 2019.

Singles main-draw entrants

Seeds

 1 Rankings are as of 23 September 2019.

Other entrants
The following players received wildcards into the singles main draw:
  Andrei Iakovlev
  Jurabek Karimov
  Timur Khabibulin
  Dostanbek Tashbulatov
  Beibit Zhukayev

The following player received entry into the singles main draw using a protected ranking:
  Maximilian Neuchrist

The following players received entry from the qualifying draw:
  Savriyan Danilov
  Fabien Reboul

The following player received entry as a lucky loser:
  Sagadat Ayap

Champions

Singles

 Illya Marchenko def.  Yannick Maden 4–6, 6–4, 6–3.

Doubles

 Harri Heliövaara /  Illya Marchenko def.  Karol Drzewiecki /  Szymon Walków 6–4, 6–4.

References

2019 ATP Challenger Tour
2019 in Kazakhstani sport
September 2019 sports events in Kazakhstan
October 2019 sports events in Kazakhstan